The Canonbury Stakes is an Australian Turf Club Group 3  Thoroughbred horse race, for two-year-old colts and geldings, held with set weights with penalties conditions, over a distance of 1100 metres at Rosehill Racecourse in Sydney, Australia in February. Total prize money for the race is A$160,000.

History

Name
The race is named after the name of the house Canonbury, which was built in 1911 by Harry Rickards near Darling Point in Sydney. After his death the house was sold to the Australian Jockey Club in 1919 and was used as a convalescent hospital for returned servicemen from World War I.

The race was originally held earlier in the racing season as an open two-year-old event but was moved for the 2007–2008 season to February as a colts and geldings event. Since 2008, the two-year-old fillies event, the Widden Stakes is held on the same racecard.

Three colts have captured the Canonbury Stakes – Golden Slipper Stakes double: 
Fine and Dandy (1958), Sebring (2007) and Vancouver (2015)

Distance
1930–1972 - 5 furlongs (~1000 metres)
1973–2003 – 1000 metres
2004–2006 – 1100 metres 
2008 – 1000 metres
2009  onwards - 1100 metres

Grade

1930–1978 -  Principal Race
1979–2014 -  Listed Race
2015 onwards - Group 3

Venue
 1930–2003 - Randwick Racecourse
 2004–2006 - Rosehill Gardens Racecourse
 2008–2011 - Randwick Racecourse
 2012 - Warwick Farm Racecourse
 2013–2019 - Rosehill Gardens Racecourse
 2020 - Randwick Racecourse
 2021 onwards - Rosehill Gardens Racecourse

Winners

 2022 - Best Of Bordeaux 
 2021 - Zethus 
2020 - Prague 
2019 - McLaren 
2018 - Performer 
2017 - Pariah  
2016 - Tessera     
2015 - Vancouver     
2014 - Fighting Sun           
2013 - Never Can Tell            
2012 - Raceway        
2011 - Diamond To Pegasus       
2010 - Hinchinbrook    
2009 - Tickets  
2008 - Sebring  
2007 - race not held
2006 - Danehill Smile  
2005 - Diego Garcia  
2004 - Bradbury's Luck  
2003 - Not A Single Doubt  
2002 - Hammerbeam  
2001 - Snowland  
2000 - Excellerator  
1999 - Kootoomootoo  
1998 - Shogun Lodge  
1997 - Brilliance  
1996 - Hockney  
1995 - The Oscars  
1994 - Vernal  
1993 - Dapper Magic  
1992 - Jetball  
1991 - Knight's Tale  
1990 - Trooping
1989 - White Crest
1988 - Silver Appeal
1987 - Iga Ninja
1986 - Mardi Gras
1985 - The Barossa
1984 - Asarka
1983 - Kingston Jamaica
1982 - Been There
1981 - Golconda D'Or
1980 - Young Willie
1979 - Massacre
1978 - Mersing
1977 - Just A Steal
1976 - Flirting Prince
1975 - Timurkhan
1974 - †Dizzy Spell / Ortillo
1973 - Suggest
1972 - Jolly Peter
1971 - Radameson
1970 - Campanello
1969 - Prince O'Jazz
1968 - Star Rise
1967 - Slippery
1966 - Constellation
1965 - Later On
1964 - Cassius
1963 - Son Of Tod
1962 - Time And Tide
1961 - Bogan Road
1960 - Pan Shah
1959 - Hydrell
1958 - Fine And Dandy
1957 - †Gabonia / Meerut
1956 - Tulloch
1955 - My Kingdom
1954 - Aboukir
1953 - Indian Empire
1952 - Grand Vite
1951 - Royal Eagle
1950 - Fengari
1949 - Navigate
1948 - Aqua Regis
1947 - Heliofly
1946 - Deep Sea
1945 - Vigaro
1944 - Tactician
1943 - Majesty
1942 - race not held
1941 - Baroda
1940 - Mannerheim
1939 - Victorine
1938 - Rival Chief
1937 - Homily
1936 - Theolos
1935 - Law King
1934 - †Golden Promise / Buller
1933 - Pasha
1932 - Burlesque
1931 - Apparel
1930 - Lightning March    

† Run in divisions

See also
 List of Australian Group races
 Group races

External links 
First three place getters Canonbury Stakes (ATC)

References

Horse races in Australia
Flat horse races for two-year-olds